Mörby centrum is a shopping mall in the municipality of Danderyd north of Stockholm. It is also the name of a station of the Stockholm Metro accessed from the shopping mall. Mörby Centrum was built in 1961 by the architects Fors & Son and has since then been expanded in several steps. It was converted into an indoor shopping mall in 1977.

See also
Mörby centrum metro station

External links
Mörby Centrum shopping mall (website in Swedish)

Shopping malls established in 1961
1961 establishments in Sweden
Shopping centres in Sweden
Buildings and structures in Stockholm County